Ranulf is a masculine given name in the English language. It is derived from the Old Norse name Reginúlfr. This Old Norse personal name is composed of two elements: the first, regin, means "advice", "decision" (and also "the gods"); the second element, úlfr, means "wolf". Reginúlfr was introduced into Scotland and northern England, by Scandinavian settlers, in the Early Middle Ages.

People with the name
 Ranulf de Vains, Ranulf the Moneyer, Norman born around circa 1015, appears around 1035 in Domesday
 Ranulf I de Soules, Norman knight who came to Scotland with David I
 Ranulf I of Aquitaine
 Ranulf II of Aquitaine
 Ranulf II, Count of Alife
 Rainulf Trincanocte, third count of Aversa 
 Ranulf de Broc (died c. 1179), royal marshall
 Ranulf Compton, United States Representative from Connecticut
 Rainulf Drengot, Norman adventurer and the first count of Aversa
 Ranulf Flambard, Bishop of Durham
 Ranulph de Gernon, 2nd Earl of Chester
 Ranulf de Glanvill, Chief Justiciar of England
 Ranulf Higdon (or Higden), English chronicler and a Benedictine monk
 Ranulf of Wareham, Bishop of Chichester
 Sir Ranulph Twisleton-Wykeham-Fiennes, 3rd Baronet, English adventurer

Fictional characters with the name
 Ranulf, character in Fire Emblem: Path of Radiance and its sequel, Fire Emblem: Radiant Dawn.
 Ranulf, an additional natural son of Henry I of England in Sharon Kay Penman's Plantagenet series. The meticulous research for which Penman is noted extends to the names of minor characters. Completely fictional characters in her books are rare and are always identified in her author's notes. They serve as devices to illustrate aspects of medieval life, to reveal information, or to bridge gaps in knowledge, especially when such revelations would be out of character for the historical figures in her novels.

References

English-language masculine given names